Al-Shaddadah or al-Shaddadi is a town in southern al-Hasakah Governorate, northeastern Syria. The town is the administrative center of the al-Shaddadah Subdistrict, which consists of 16 municipalities. At the 2004 census, al-Shaddadah had a population of 15,806.

Name and geography 
The town's name might be derived from "Shadadu"; a governor of the district of "Suru" mentioned in the annals of the Assyria king Assurnasirpal II. The town is situated off the western bank of the Khabur River. Nearby localities include al-Sabaa wa Arbain to the west.

Civil war 

In the course of the  civil war, the city was attacked by the al-Nusra Front in the February 2013 Battle of Shaddadi and was captured three days later. According to the Syrian Observatory for Human Rights, over 100 Syrian Army soldiers and 40 al-Nusra fighters were killed, as well as dozens of petroleum workers.

The city was later taken by the Islamic State and remained one of the last IS strongholds in the province.

When in October 2015, the Kurdish-majority YPG and their multiethnic partners, including the al-Sanadid Forces of the Arab Shammar tribe, joined forces to form the SDF , al-Sanadid leader Bandar al-Humaydi made it an "immediate priority to liberate al-Hawl and al-Shaddadah from the Islamic State.”

On 24 November, it became known that Islamic State militants were transferring their family members further south to the Deir ez-Zor Governorate. After the SDF captured the South Hasakah Dam on 30 November, they continued their offensive southward, towards the city of al-Shaddadah, now IS's last stronghold in al-Hasakah province. Subsequently, Arab tribal leaders reportedly urged IS to withdraw from the city "peacefully," in order to prevent civilian casualties and the possible collapse of al-Shaddadi's economic infrastructure, if a destructive battle between the SDF/coalition forces and the Islamic State were to occur. It was also reported that IS was beginning to evacuate some of its positions near al-Shaddadi.

On 19 February 2016, the town was captured by the SDF.

On 21 January 2019, US and SDF forces were attacked by a VBIED. The Islamic State claimed responsibility for the attack through an affiliated news service.

An American presence continues to exist in the town, including helicopter forces.

References 

Populated places in al-Hasakah District
Towns in al-Hasakah Governorate